Flax tamborai is a moth of the family Erebidae first described by Michael Fibiger in 2011. It is found in Indonesia (it was described from Mount Tambora on Sumbawa).

The wingspan is 10.5–12 mm. The forewings are beige brown, with grey-brown subterminal and terminal areas, including the fringes. There is a dark-brown quadrangular patch in the upper medial area. The crosslines are indistinct, brown, outlined in beige. The terminal line is only indicated by black interveinal dots. The hindwings are grey with an indistinct discal spot. The underside of the forewings is unicolorous light brown and the underside of the hindwings is grey with a discal spot.

References

Micronoctuini
Moths described in 2011
Taxa named by Michael Fibiger